is a former Japanese football player.

Playing career
Ninomiya was born in Oita Prefecture on November 23, 1982. After graduating from high school, he joined J1 League club Avispa Fukuoka in 2001. However he could not play at all in the match and Avispa was relegated to J2 League end of 2001 season. He debuted in 2002 Emperor's Cup and played 2 matches. However he could only play these matches until 2003. In 2004, he moved to his local club Hoyo in Prefectural Leagues.

Club statistics

References

External links
j-league

1982 births
Living people
Association football people from Ōita Prefecture
Japanese footballers
J1 League players
J2 League players
Avispa Fukuoka players
Verspah Oita players
Association football midfielders